Dante Rivera (born August 12, 1984 in Manhattan, New York) is an American retired mixed martial artist.  He was a cast member of SpikeTV's The Ultimate Fighter 7 making it to the quarterfinals where he was defeated by Jesse Taylor.

Dante Rivera is the owner of Danter Rivera Brazilian Jiu-Jitsu in Freehold NJ. He operates a successful school with kids, teens, and adult classes.

Mixed martial arts career

The Ultimate Fighter
Dante was selected to be a part of the seventh season of The Ultimate Fighter. In order to get into the house and actually compete on the show, Rivera had to fight John Wood, a training partner of Forrest Griffin. Rivera defeated Wood via kimura submission and was then selected to be a part of Griffin's team. In the first round of the tournament, Rivera was matched up against Brandon Sene, defeating him via decision and moving him onto the next round. Rivera's next fight came against teammate Jesse Taylor. Taylor defeated Rivera via unanimous decision and ended Rivera's chances of winning the show.

During the show, Rivera was consistently shown arguing with the young and inexperienced Matt Riddle. Dante, on more the one occasion, stated that he would retire if Riddle defeated him.

Ultimate Fighting Championship
Dante fought Matt Riddle at the TUF 7 Finale. Dante was defeated by Riddle via decision (30-27, 30-27, 29-28). When asked by Joe Rogan if he will retire as he had stated on The Ultimate Fighter, Dante declined and said he would continue to fight. After the loss, he was released from his contract.

Post UFC
He made his post UFC debut against a castoff from The Ultimate Fighter 7, Paul Bradley. Rivera was defeated after being knocked out before the minute mark. He bounced back with a win over Lamont Lister and a win over WEC vet, Justin Haskins.

Rivera fought fellow TUF alumni, Dan Cramer, for a small New Jersey promotion. After three rounds, the fight went to the judges and Rivera was awarded the victory via split decision (30-27, 28-29, 30-27). Many spectators were upset with the decision believing that Rivera had dominated the fight and had convincingly won all three rounds.  According to his Twitter he frequently works to increase his cardio by innovating the art of dynamic rollerblading.

Bellator MMA
Rivera made his promotional debut against former Bellator welterweight champion Lyman Good on April 4, 2013 at Bellator 95. Good defeated Rivera via unanimous decision (30-27, 30-27, 29-28).

Rivera was expected to face promotional newcomer Nah-Shon Burrell on November 15, 2013 at Bellator 108. However, Rivera was removed from the card due to undisclosed reasons and Burrell was rescheduled to face Jesus Martinez.
Dante Rivera won his last Bellator fight win a dominant performance against tough fighter Gemiyale Adkins.

Mixed martial arts record

|-
|Win
|align=center|16–7
|Gemiyale Adkins
|Decision (unanimous)
|Bellator 118
|
|align=center|3
|align=center|5:00
|Atlantic City, New Jersey, United States
|
|-
|Loss
|align=center|15–7
|Lyman Good
|Decision (unanimous)
|Bellator 95
|
|align=center|3
|align=center|5:00
|Atlantic City, New Jersey, United States
|
|-
|Win
|align=center|15–6
|Dan Cramer
|Decision (split)
|Elite MMA: MMA Mayhem
|
|align=center|3
|align=center|5:00
|Jackson, New Jersey, United States
|
|-
|Win
|align=center|14–6
|Ryan Contaldi
|Submission
|UCC 2: Strikedown
|
|align=center|2
|align=center|3:20
|Jersey City, New Jersey, United States
|
|-
|Loss
|align=center|13–6
|Herbert Goodman
|Decision (unanimous)
|Adrenaline MMA: New Breed
|
|align=center|3
|align=center|5:00
|Atlantic City, New Jersey, United States
|
|-
|Win
|align=center|13–5
|Justin Haskins
|Submission (rear naked choke)
|Ring of Combat 27
|
|align=center|2
|align=center|3:51
|Atlantic City, New Jersey, United States
|
|-
|Win
|align=center|12–5
|Lamont Lister
|Submission (guillotine choke)
|Ring of Combat 24
|
|align=center|1
|align=center|1:25
|Atlantic City, New Jersey, United States
|
|-
|Loss
|align=center|11–5
|Paul Bradley
|TKO (punches)
|Ring of Combat 22
|
|align=center|1
|align=center|0:34
|Atlantic City, New Jersey, United States
|
|-
|Loss
|align=center|11–4
|Matt Riddle
|Decision (unanimous)
|The Ultimate Fighter 7 Finale
|
|align=center|3
|align=center|5:00
|Las Vegas, Nevada, United States
|
|-
|Win
|align=center|11–3
|Nissim Levy
|TKO
|IFL: 2007 Semifinals   	
|
|align=center|3
|align=center|1:15
|East Rutherford, New Jersey, United States
|
|-
|Win
|align=center|10–3
|Alex Aquino
|Submission (heel hook)
|Cage Fury Fighting Championships 5
|
|align=center|2
|align=center|2:41
|Atlantic City, New Jersey, United States
|
|-
|Loss
|align=center|9–3
|Tim Kennedy
|Submission (punches)  	
|IFL: Atlanta
|
|align=center|2
|align=center|2:29
|Atlanta, Georgia, United States
|
|-
|Win
|align=center|9–2
|Eric Charles
|Submission (arm triangle choke)
|Cage Fury Fighting Championships 3
|
|align=center|2
|align=center|4:51
|Atlantic City, New Jersey, United States
|
|-
|Win
|align=center|8–2
|Eric Tavares
|TKO (referee stoppage)
|CITC 3: Marked Territory
|
|align=center|1
|align=center|4:44
|Lincroft, New Jersey, United States
|
|-
|Loss
|align=center|7–2
|Mike Massenzio
|Decision (unanimous)
|RF 13: Battle at the Beach
|
|align=center|3
|align=center|5:00
|Wildwood, New Jersey, United States
|
|-
|Win
|align=center|7–1
|Ronald Stalling
|Decision (unanimous)
|Reality Fighting 11
|
|align=center|3
|align=center|5:00
|Atlantic City, New Jersey, United States
|
|-
|Win
|align=center|6–1
|Jerry Spiegel
|Submission (triangle choke)
|Reality Fighting 10
|
|align=center|1
|align=center|1:26
|Atlantic City, New Jersey, United States
|
|-
|Win
|align=center|5–1
|Josh Pupa
|Submission (guillotine choke)
|Reality Fighting 9
|
|align=center|1
|align=center|3:59
|Wildwood, New Jersey, United States
|
|-
|Loss
|align=center|4–1
|Lance Everson
|Decision (unanimous)
|Reality Fighting 8
|
|align=center|5
|align=center|5:00
|Atlantic City, New Jersey, United States
|
|-
|Win
|align=center|4–0
|Jose Rodriguez
|TKO
|Ring of Combat 7
|
|align=center|1
|align=center|4:37
|New Jersey, United States
|
|-
|Win
|align=center|3–0
|Jay Handley
|Submission (guillotine)
|Reality Fighting 7
|
|align=center|1
|align=center|1:00
|Atlantic City, New Jersey, United States
|
|-
|Win
|align=center|2–0
|Lionel Cortes
|Decision
|Reality Fighting 6
|
|align=center|5
|align=center|5:00
|Wildwood, New Jersey, United States
|
|-
|Win
|align=center|1–0
|Chris Scanlon
|Decision (unanimous)
|SF 1 - Bragging Rights
|
|align=center|2
|align=center|5:00
|Bayonne, New Jersey, United States
|

See also
 List of Bellator MMA alumni

References

External links
 
 

American practitioners of Brazilian jiu-jitsu
People awarded a black belt in Brazilian jiu-jitsu
American male mixed martial artists
Mixed martial artists utilizing Brazilian jiu-jitsu
1974 births
Living people